Chibuku is a commercial sorghum beer based on the traditional Umqombothi home made African beers, the main grains used are malted sorghum and maize but may also contain millet.

The brand name

The name Chibuku comes from Max Heinrich's habit of recording all consumers' comments and process changes in a book, and Chibuku is an adaptation of the local word for "book" - "Chi" is the prefix meaning "big", "buk" = "book", and the terminal "u" is because most African nouns tend to end in a euphonic vowel.
The shake-shake comes from the ritual of first shaking up the beer before taking the first sip. The beer contains starch, the germ and yeast (all normally removed in lagers and ales) and since the solids settle to the bottom of the carton, it needs to be shaken before sipping.

Alcohol content

The alcohol content in a fresh Chibuku is fairly low starting at about 0.5% ABV on day one, but as fermentation continues in the carton, the longer it is kept before drinking, the stronger it gets. It may achieve 4% ABV before the shelf-life expires after between 4 and 6 days after packaging.

The brand

Chibuku is a pan-African brand of opaque sorghum beer made by various brewers across Africa. Part of the reason for the success of the brand is the commercial brewing process with systems to ensure a consistent quality product that is safe for consumers.

Chibuku is often the choice of less affluent consumers who can't afford bottled beer, and this may still be the case for many of the consumers in Zimbabwe, Zambia, Malawi and Botswana. However there are also consumers in the emerging middle class who enjoy the beer as a preference, because of the taste and for the health connotations.

Production
Chibuku is now brewed across Africa by various brewers.
 Botswana it is brewed by Botswana Breweries subsidiary of Kgalagadi Breweries Limited
 Ghana by Accra Brewing Limited
 Malawi by Chibuku Products Ltd
 Mozambique by Cervejas de Mocambique
 South Africa by United National Breweries (SA)
Tanzania by Tanzania Breweries Ltd
 Uganda by Nile Breweries Limited
 Zambia by National Breweries PLC (Zambia)
 Zimbabwe by Delta Corporation - Chibuku was first brewed at a brewery in Fort Victoria in 1962.

See also

 Umqombothi
 Commercial sorghum

References

Beer in Africa
Beer in South Africa
SABMiller
Sorghum
African drinks
South African cuisine
Fermented drinks